This is a list of individuals who have performed as members of the Houston Ballet.

2014-2015 season
The dancers as of March 2015 are:

Principals 

-->
Franca Florio
-->
• Robert Blakis - as the bay harbour butcher

 Simon Ball
 Ian Casady
 Ermanno Florio
 Karina Gonzalez
 Yuriko Kajiya
 Melody Mennite
 Connor Walsh
 Sara Webb

First soloists 

 Jessica Collado
 Linnar Looris
 Jared Matthews
 Katharine Precourt

Soloists 

 Soo Youn Cho
 Christopher Coomer
 James Gotesky
 Oliver Halkowich
 Nozomi Iijima
 Nao Kusuzaki
 Allison Miller
 Aaron Robison
 Lauren Strongin
 Charles-Louis Yoshiyama

Demi soloists 

 Emily Bowen
 Elise Elliott (née Judson)
 Christopher Gray
 Jim Nowakowski

Corps de ballet 

 Asia Bui
 Ana Calderon
 Chun Wai Chan
 Shahar Dori
 Rupert Edwards
 Rhodes Elliott
 Rhys Kosakowski
 Bridget Kuhns
 Dylan Lackey
 Zecheng Liang
 Jacquelyn Long
 Katelyn May
 William Newton
 Aaron Sharratt
 Madeline Skelly
 Alyssa Springer
 Hayden Stark
 Megumi Takeda
 Natalie Varnum
 Brian Waldrep
 Harper Watters
 Joel Woellner
 Chae Eun Yang

Apprentices 

 Kaleigh Courts
 Tyler Donatelli
 Aoi Fujiwara
 Satoko Konishi
 Mallory Mehaffey
 Deanna Pearson
 Michael Ryan

2012-2013 season

Principals 

 Simon Ball
 Ian Casady
 Karina Gonzalez
 Mireille Hassenboehler
 Melody Mennite
 Connor Walsh
 Joseph Walsh
 Sara Webb

First soloists 

 Melissa Hough
 Linnar Looris
 Kelly Myernick

Soloists 

 Jessica Collado
 Christopher Coomer
 James Gotesky
 Oliver Halkowich
 Ilya Kozadayev
 Nao Kusuzaki
 Katharine Precourt
 Aaron Robison
 Lauren Strongin

Demi soloists 

 Soo Youn Cho
 Nozomi Iijima
 Allison Miller
 Charles-Louis Yoshiyama
 Jim Nowakowski

Corps de ballet 

 Aria Alekzander
 Emily Bowen
 Chun Wai Chan
 Shahar Dori
 Rupert Edwards
 Rhodes Elliott
 Sadie Elliot
 Christopher Gray
 Elise Judson
 Jacquelyn Long
 Katelyn May
 Madison Morris
 William Newton
 Derek Dunn
 Aaron Sharratt
 Megumi Takeda
 Natalie Varnum
 Brian Waldrep
 Harper Watters
 Liao Xiang

References

External links

Houston Ballet
Houston
Ballet-related lists